Mirage is a 1965 American neo noir thriller film directed by Edward Dmytryk from a screenplay by Peter Stone, based on the 1952 novel Fallen Angel, written by Howard Fast under the pseudonym Walter Ericson; the novel is not credited by title onscreen. The film stars Gregory Peck, Diane Baker, Walter Matthau, George Kennedy, Leif Erickson, and Kevin McCarthy, and was released by Universal Pictures.

Plot
During a power outage in the skyscraper where he works, cost accountant David Stillwell (Gregory Peck) decides to exit using the darkened stairs. While descending, he encounters a young woman, Shela (Diane Baker), who seems to know him, but he has no recollection of her. Alarmed, she flees to the sub-basement.

Outside is the body of the noted philanthropist and peace activist Charles Calvin (Walter Abel), who apparently jumped from his office window in the same building. Having a drink in a nearby bar, Stillwell feels ill-at-ease and flashes back to his encounter with Shela. He returns to his office building, but now the sub-basement does not exist. A man, Willard (George Kennedy), is working in the basement and tells Stillwell to leave.

At Stillwell's apartment building, a stranger, Lester (Jack Weston), pulls out a gun and forces him into the apartment. He orders Stillwell to get his briefcase and go meet "the Major". Stillwell, not knowing what he is referring to, knocks out Lester and hides him in a hallway service closet.

While attempting to report this to the police, Stillwell becomes distressed by basic questions about his background and storms out. He suddenly realizes he has no memory of anything before the two years of his present job. Stillwell consults a psychiatrist, Dr. Broden (Robert H. Harris), who throws him out, declaring it impossible to have amnesia for two years without being aware.

Stillwell hires novice private detective Ted Caselle (Walter Matthau). Skeptical at first, Caselle believes his client after spotting Willard following them. He inspects Stillwell's apartment. The refrigerator, which was previously empty, is inexplicably fully stocked. Stillwell takes Caselle to his office, located near Calvin's, but there is now only a blank wall. They go to the basement; Willard arrives and shoots at them, but they escape.

Stillwell encounters Shela again. She says "the Major" urgently wants something from him, and reveals that she and Stillwell previously had a relationship. She reluctantly accompanies him to see Joe Turtle, a concierge at Stillwell's workplace who knows him, but Turtle has been murdered by Lester. Stillwell forces Shela to see what her associates are capable of.

The two spend the night together, but Stillwell wakes to find Shela gone. Lester and Willard are waiting downstairs. He disarms Lester and uses him as a shield, but Willard callously kills Lester. Stillwell escapes and goes to Caselle's office, but finds him dead.

Stillwell's intermittent flashbacks are becoming more regular and detailed. He revisits Dr. Broden. They work out that Stillwell's amnesia is only two days old. Broden helps Stillwell understand that he has been recalling false memories; his mind was replacing traumatic memories. Stillwell realizes he is not a cost accountant, but rather a "physio-chemist" and Calvin's protégé. He normally resides in New York, but the last two years worked in California at a private research facility (which has multiple sub-basement levels) under a man named Sylvester Josephson (Kevin McCarthy).

Stillwell visits Calvin's widow who believes he killed Calvin. Stillwell suddenly remembers Calvin falling through a window. He notices a photograph of Calvin with an Army officer that Mrs. Calvin says is Major Crawford Gilcuddy. Stillwell goes to see the Major, where he also finds Willard (who then beats him up), Josephson, and Shela, who is the Major's girlfriend.

Stillwell's memory returns completely. He had discovered a method to neutralize nuclear radiation; though ostensibly for peaceful purposes, this discovery would make using nuclear weapons more desirable. When Stillwell went to New York to consult Calvin, he discovered that Calvin, as head of a non-profit agency, was illegally conducting business with the Major. The Major turned off the building's power to prevent Stillwell from leaving. During their argument, Stillwell metaphorically claimed he would become a "cost accountant" for nuclear war. To prevent his discovery being weaponized, Stillwell burned the document containing the formula; as Calvin grabbed for it, he fell out the window to his death. The shocking event caused Stillwell's amnesia.

To force Stillwell to recreate his formula, the Major has Willard play Russian roulette with his gun pointed at Stillwell's head. Shela shoots Willard. Josephson grabs her gun, but Stillwell convinces him the Major will not let Josephson live (as he knows too much about the secret project); Josephson calls the police. Stillwell and Shela embrace.

Cast

Production 
The screenplay was written by Peter Stone as a follow-up to the hugely successful Charade. Matthau and Kennedy were holdovers from the cast of Charade.

Filming took place on a number of locations in the New York Financial District. The fictitious Unidyne company was headquartered at 2 Broadway. Another key location in the film is the walk with Peck and Baker through Battery Park to City Pier A.

The movie was filmed between 24 October and 24 December 1964 on Eastman Kodak black and white film 4-X 5224 and first released in the USA on 26 May 1965.

Critical reception
The New York Times wrote "In brisk, colloquial, occasionally humorous style, this exercise in mayhem, murder, mental instability and moralizing about the scientist's place in an atomic world, evolves as an interesting, fairly taut, if not especially credible, chase-mystery"; whereas Variety noted "There are moments of stiff action and suspense but plot is as confusing as it is overly-contrived." However, more recently, Time Out called it "one of the better thrillers of the '60s," concluding that "The harsh b/w photography, the various levels of reality, and the use of urban landscape, all contribute to the feeling of unease, building up an atmosphere that is perhaps better than the mechanics of the plot deserve."

Musical score and soundtrack

The film score was composed, arranged and conducted by Quincy Jones, and the soundtrack album was released on the Mercury label in 1965.

Track listing
All compositions by Quincy Jones
 "Mirage (Vocal Version)" (Lyrics by Robert Russell) - 2:18
 "Boobie Baby" − 3:20
 "Shoot to Kill" − 2:28
 "Dead Duck" − 3:12
 "Purple Rose" − 3:06
 "Main Title" − 2:50
 "Mirage (Instrumental Version)" − 3:34
 "Turtle's Last Lap" − 3:34
 "A Shot in the Park" − 4:03
 "Kinda Scary" − 4:33
 "End Title" − 2:51

Personnel
 Unidentified orchestra arranged and conducted by Quincy Jones.

See also
List of American films of 1965

References

External links
 
 
 Mirage at Film Noir of the Week by Wheeler Winston Dixon

1965 films
1960s mystery thriller films
American black-and-white films
American mystery thriller films
American neo-noir films
Fictional accountants
Films about amnesia
Films based on American novels
Films directed by Edward Dmytryk
Films scored by Quincy Jones
Films set in New York City
Films shot in New York City
Universal Pictures films
1960s English-language films
1960s American films